Hussein Melhem Awada (born 22 March 1990) is a Lebanese footballer who plays as a forward.

Awada began his career at Nahda Barelias, before moving to Mabarra in 2007. Four seasons later, in 2011, Awada moved to Salam Sour, before joining Ahed in 2012, with whom he won a league title in 2014–15. In 2016 Awada joined Safa, before joining Shabab Arabi after one season. He moved to Ansar in 2018, then to rivals Nejmeh two years later, and then moved to Sagesse in summer 2021.

Between 2013 and 2016, Awada represented Lebanon internationally; he played 20 games, scoring one goal.

Club career 
Awada began his senior career at Nahda Barelias, before moving to Lebanese Premier League club Mabarra during the 2007–08 season. Following four seasons at the club, Awada moved to Salam Sour in 2011. He scored five league goals in 19 games during the 2011–12 season. In 2012 Awada joined Ahed; in his first season at the club (2012–13), he scored six goals in 19 league games. In 2013 Awada won his first major trophy, helping Ahed win the 2013 Lebanese Elite Cup. During his four-season stay at Ahed, Awada would lift a league title (2014–15), another Elite Cup (2015), and a Super Cup (2015).

On 11 August 2016, defending champions Safa acquired Awada from Ahed. The forward remained at Safa for one season, scoring four goals in 18 games. On 29 August 2017, Awada moved to Shabab Arabi; he scored 1 goal in 14 matches during the 2017–18 season. On 11 September 2018, Awada moved to Ansar.

On 29 September 2020, Awada joined cross-city rivals Nejmeh. He moved to Sagesse on 8 September 2021, and terminated his contract on mutual terms in December 2022.

International career 
Awada made his international debut for Lebanon on 29 May 2013, in a friendly against Oman; the match ended in a 1–1 draw. Awada's first international goal came on 19 February 2014, in a friendly against Pakistan. The Lebanese forward helped his side win 3–1.

Career statistics

International 
Scores and results list Lebanon's goal tally first, score column indicates score after each Awada goal.

Honours
Ahed
 Lebanese Premier League: 2014–15
 Lebanese Elite Cup: 2013, 2015
 Lebanese Super Cup: 2015
 Lebanese FA Cup runner-up: 2020–21

Nejmeh
 Lebanese Elite Cup: 2021
 Lebanese Super Cup runner-up: 2021

Individual
 Lebanese Premier League Best Goal: 2011–12

References

External links

 
 
  (2011–2020)
  (2020–present)
 
 

1990 births
Living people
People from Baalbek
Lebanese footballers
Association football forwards
Al Mabarra Club players
Al Ahed FC players
Safa SC players
Al Shabab Al Arabi Club Beirut players
Al Ansar FC players
Nejmeh SC players
Sagesse SC footballers
Lebanese Premier League players
Lebanese Second Division players
Lebanon youth international footballers
Lebanon international footballers